Spoed is a Belgian action drama TV series produced in the Dutch language in Belgium since 2000. The series is also shown on both Flemish/Belgian TV and Dutch TV. The series is directed by Johan Thiels and Guy Thys. The series has produced 217 episodes to date.  It may be compared to the American TV programs ER or Chicago Hope.

Main cast
Leo Madder ....  Luc Gijsbrecht (204 episodes, 2000–2007)
Kurt Rogiers .... Filip Driessen
Ann Van den Broeck .... Iris van de Vijver
Magda Cnudde .... Bea Goossens
Sven de Ridder .... Steven Hofkens
Arlette Sterckx ....  Lies Weemaes (191 episodes, 2000–2006)
Gert Lahousse ....  Bob Verly (114 episodes, 2000–2006)
Peggy De Landtsheer ....  Marijke Willems (64 episodes, 2000–2006)
   
Actress Grietje Vanderheijden has also made an appearance in the series.

External links

Flemish television shows
Belgian drama television shows
VTM (TV channel) original programming